James Wills (1 January 1790 – November 1868) was an Irish writer and poet.

Wills was born in County Roscommon, the younger son of a landowner. He was educated at Trinity College, Dublin, and studied law in the Middle Temple, London. Deprived, however, of the fortune destined for him and the means of pursuing a legal career by the extravagance of his elder brother, he entered the Church. From 1822 to 1838, he lived in Dublin and wrote in the Dublin University Magazine, Blackwood's Magazine and other periodicals. He supported the Reverend Caesar Otway in building up the Irish Quarterly Review.

In 1831, he published The Disembodied and other Poems. The Philosophy of Unbelief (1835) attracted much attention. He actually wrote the famous poem "The Universe", even though it was published in 1821 under the name of Charles Maturin. He was editor of the Dublin University Magazine in 1841 and 1842.

His largest work was Lives of Illustrious and Distinguished Irishmen, and his last publication The Idolatress (1868). In all his writings gave evidence of a powerful personality. His poems are spirited, and in some cases show considerable dramatic qualities.

He died in Attanagh, County Laois. The famous dramatist and painter William Gorman Wills was his son.

External links

References

 

1790 births
1868 deaths
Irish poets
People from County Roscommon
19th-century Irish poets